"Lover Like Me" is a song by South Korean rapper, singer, and songwriter CL. It was released on September 29, 2021, through her self-managed Very Cherry as the second single from CL's debut studio album, Alpha (2021). The song was written by CL, Anne-Marie, Freedo, Nafla, Cleo Tighe, and Sarah Blanchard, whilst production was handled by Freedo and Nick Lee.

Background and composition
On September 17, four days after attending the annual Met Gala fashion event in New York City, CL announced via her social media platforms that her upcoming second single, titled "Lover Like Me", would be released on September 29. It was made available for digital download and streaming as the second single off of her debut studio album, Alpha.

Composed in the key signature of C♯ major, the song contains a tempo of 158 BPM. Stylistically, "Lover Like Me" showcases a different charm in contrast to Alphas first single, "Spicy", which was released a month prior. Caitlin White from Uproxx commented that "'Lover Like Me' has the braggadocio of 'Spicy' but it's undercut with some of the softness of her pop sound." Teen Vogues Jazmine Denise commented that it "will instantly trigger nostalgic feelings associated with early '00s R&B; it oozes self-confidence and sass as CL brazenly reminds an ex-lover that she’s one of a kind." Regarding its lyrical content, W Korea noted that "although it looks like a story about love, it can also be interpreted as a story about CL as a musician", the refining of her identity.

Reception
Writing for Beats Per Minute, Chase McMullen contrasted the song to the open aggressiveness of "Spicy", saying it "practically glides, with CL displaying her equal strength for softer vocals. That doesn't mean she’s dropped even an ounce of that famous attitude." He additionally highlighted its catchiness, calling it "an instant, delightfully bitter, earworm." In its debut week, the song entered at number 35 on the Gaon Download Chart.

Music video and promotion
The music video for "Lover Like Me" was uploaded to CL's YouTube channel simultaneously with the release of the single on September 29; a teaser video was uploaded via the same platform two days prior. The music video features shots of CL in brightly colored sets, including a room covered in sunflowers, as well as a red-tinted studio full of vintage television sets.

Credits and personnel
Credits adapted from Melon.

 Lee Chae-rin – vocals, lyricist
 Freedo – lyricist, composer
 Anne-Marie Nicholson – lyricist
 Nafla – lyricist
 Cleo Tighe – lyricist
 Sarah Blanchard – lyricist
 Nick Lee – composer

Release history

References

2021 songs
2021 singles
Songs written by Anne-Marie (singer)